Amboasary Sud (Amboasary Atsimo) is a town in Anosy Region, Madagascar.  It is the main town of Amboasary Sud District.
It has a population of 45,989 in 2018.

Geography 
It is located at the Mandrare River, approximately 75 km from Fort-Dauphin and 35 km from Ambovombe.

Economy
The economy of the town is dominated by sisal plantations and 3 transforming companies.

Sports
 FC Amboasary Atsimo (regional soccer champion 2011 & 2012)
 ASMO Amboasary (regional soccer champion 2020)

Points of interest
The privately owned Berenty Reserve is close to Amobasary.
 Bay of Italy (Italy significates Where there is the wind in Malgache language)
 Anony Lake with its flamingoes and the caves called Jurassique Cirque (Jurassic Circus).

Infrastructures
The town is linked to Tôlanaro (Fort Dauphin) by the National road 13 (73 km).

References 

Populated places in Anosy